Irina Konstantinovna Skobtseva (22 August 1927 – 20 October 2020) was a Soviet and Russian actress and second wife of Sergei Bondarchuk.

Biography
Irina Konstantinovna Skobtseva was born on 22 August 1927 in Tula. Her father was a research fellow at the Main Directorate of Meteorological Service, her mother worked in the archive.

After finishing secondary school, Skobtseva studied art in the Faculty of History of Moscow State University. While studying, she acted in student theatre.

After graduating from the Moscow State University in 1952, she entered the Moscow Art Theatre School, from which she graduated in 1955.

In the same year, Irina Skobtseva made her cinematic debut as Desdemona in the film Othello by Sergei Yutkevich. The picture won the Best Director Award at the 1956 Cannes Film Festival, and was given diplomas and prizes at other international film festivals. In Cannes Irina Skobtseva was awarded the title "Miss Charm of the Cannes Film Festival".

After Othello Irina Skobtseva, who remained in the audience's view primarily as a romantic heroine, turned to character acting. She played Cyrus in the film adaptation of Leonid Leonov's play The Ordinary Man (1956) and Klavdia Nikolaevna in Unrepeatable Spring (1957).

Filming in Othello, where the partner of Skobtseva was actor and director Sergei Bondarchuk who in 1959 became her husband, laid the foundations for a number of their joint works in the cinema. The actress played both in the films produced by Bondarchuk himself, War and Peace (1965-1967), They Fought for Their Country (1975), The Steppe (1977), Boris Godunov (1986), and in films by other directors — Splendid Days (1960), Silence of Doctor Evans (1973), Take Aim (1975), Such High Mountains (1974), Velvet Season (1978), Father Sergius (1978), The Gadfly (1980).

Irina Skobtseva also performed roles in the pictures of Bondarchuk Waterloo (1970), Red Bells II (1982) and Quiet Flows the Don (1992) - the last work of Sergei Bondarchuk.

In the pictures of Georgiy Daneliya Walking the Streets of Moscow (1963), Thirty Three (1965) and Hopelessly Lost (1973), Irina Skobtseva appeared as a comedic actress. One of her best comedy roles is Lidia Sergeevna in the film Eldar Ryazanov's Zigzag of Success (1969).

The actress played the main roles in the films The Mysterious Heir (1987), The Ghosts of the Green Room (1991), Zorka Venus (2000).

In 2000 Skobtseva starred in the series The Heirs (2001, 2005), Amber Wings (2003), Women's Logic (2004, 2005), Gold (2012). She performed roles in such films and series as Actress (2007), Dark Planet (2009), In the Style of Jazz (2010), The White Guard (2012), The Secret of the Dark Room (2014), Dangerous Holidays (2016).

Since 1957, Skobtseva was an actress of the National Film Actors' Theatre.

Since 1971, she taught acting, was an assistant professor of the department of acting at VGIK and together with Sergei Bondarchuk led an acting studio. Among her students were Olga Kabo, Natalya Andrejchenko, Vladimir Basov, Jr., Alexey Ivashchenko.

Honors
Irina Skobtseva received the title People's Artist of the RSFSR in 1974. In 1997, she was awarded the Order of Friendship.

In 2017, the actress was awarded the Order of St. Sergius of Radonezh.

Irina Skobtseva was awarded the prize of the name Stanislav and Andrei Rostotsky for roles in the feature films Another Woman, Another Man (2003), Amber Wings (2003), a special jury prize for the cast in the film The Heirs (2001) Społokhi in Arkhangelsk.

Personal life
Irina Skobtseva was married to actor and film director Sergei Bondarchuk. Their daughter, Yelena Bondarchuk was an actress of theater and cinema. Their son, Fyodor Bondarchuk is a film director, actor and producer, chairman of the board of directors of Lenfilm.

Retirement and death
She semi-retired in the 1980s, but made some later appearances on television. She died in 2020. Her grandson, Konstantin Kryukov, was among those who attended the funeral.

Selected filmography
 Othello (1955) as Desdemona
 A Unique Spring (1957) as Claudia Novozhilova
 Splendid Days (1960) as Marianna
 Walking the Streets of Moscow (1963) as Nadya
 Thirty Three (1965) as Vera Sergeyevna
 War and Peace (1966-1967) as Hélène Kuragin
 Zigzag of Success (1968) as Lidia Sergeevna, photographer
 Waterloo (1970) as Maria
 Hopelessly Lost (1973) as widow of Douglas
 Earthly Love (1974) as Elizaveta Polivanova
 Take Aim (1975) as Marina Kurchatova
 They Fought for Their Country (1975) as senior nurse
 Father Sergius (1978) as baroness
 The Gadfly (1980) as Gladys Burton
 Red Bells II (1983) as countess Panina
 Mary Poppins, Goodbye (1983) as miss Lark
 Time and the Conways (1984) as Magee
 Boris Godunov (1986) as the innkeeper
 The Envy of Gods (2000) as Sonia's mother
 Amber Wings (2003) as Yelizaveta Sergeyevna
 Heat (2006) as landlord
 Happy Together (2006, TV) as Laura Larionova's mother
 Actress (2007) as Varvara Fominichna
 In the Style of Jazz (2010) as former mother-in-law of Sergey Saveliev
 The White Guard (2012, TV) as Maria Nai-Turs

Honors and awards
 Honored Artist of the RSFSR (1965)
 People's Artist of the RSFSR (1974)
 Order of Friendship (1997)
 Order of Honour (2018)

References

External links

 

1927 births
2020 deaths
Actresses from Moscow
Bondarchuk family
Soviet film actresses
Academicians of the Russian Academy of Cinema Arts and Sciences "Nika"
Honored Artists of the RSFSR
People's Artists of the RSFSR
Recipients of the Order of Honour (Russia)
Sergei Bondarchuk
Moscow Art Theatre School alumni
Actresses from Tula, Russia